Harlington Shereni (born 6 July 1975) is a former Zimbabwean football midfielder.

Career 
Born in Chiredzi, Shereni was studying engineering at the Zimbabwe School of Aviation when he was signed by Dynamos Harare. He featured in the Dynamos' side that reached the 1998 CAF Champions League Final.

Prior to the end of the 2007 season it was confirmed by Sherini that he would not look to extend his contract at En Avant Guingamp beyond the summer and felt it was time to move on. This was met by great disappointment by the fans as he had been the rock in the centre of midfield for three years. Just a few days before his contract was to end in June Harlington announced he would be signing a one-year extension due to his love for the club and its fans. The Guingamp board thought it unnecessary to draw up the contract right away as they believed Shereni was true to his word. Under a week later FC Nantes announced Shereni had signed for them on a free transfer, causing many fans of En Avant Guingamp to question his loyalty and sources of motivation.

International 
On 29 May 2008 Shereni was named in the 18 men roster, to face Guinea on 06/01/08 for the first time in three years by new coach Valinhos.

Shereni retired from international football in October 2008.

References

External links
 Player profile at L'Equipe

1975 births
Living people
Zimbabwean footballers
Zimbabwe international footballers
Dynamos F.C. players
FC Istres players
En Avant Guingamp players
FC Nantes players
RC Strasbourg Alsace players
SR Delémont players
Ligue 1 players
Ligue 2 players
Zimbabwean expatriate footballers
Expatriate footballers in France
Expatriate footballers in Switzerland
2004 African Cup of Nations players
Association football midfielders